KZXR-FM (101.7 FM) is a radio station broadcasting a regional Mexican music format. Licensed to Prosser, Washington, United States, the station is currently owned by Amador and Rosalie Bustos' Bustos Media, through licensee Bustos Media Holdings, LLC.

History
The station was assigned the call letters KACA on February 3, 1963. The station has since held a number of call signs over its history, changing to KZXR on May 20, 1992, to KZXR-FM on September 14, 1998, to KMNA on June 16, 2000, to KLES on May 25, 2006, and to KZXR-FM again on October 11, 2017.

References

External links
 Official Website
 

Prosser, Washington
ZXR-FM
ZXR-FM
Regional Mexican radio stations in the United States
Radio stations established in 1963
1963 establishments in Washington (state)